Del mio meglio n.3 is a compilation album by Italian singer Mina released in 1975. The album is composed of tracks previously released on album, except for "Non gioco più" and "La scala buia", side A and side B of a 45rpm published in 1974. Mina also covered these last two songs in Spanish with the titles of "No juego más" and "Me siento libre". "Non gioco più" was the theme song of Mina's last TV show Milleluci.

Track listing

Credits
Mina – vocals
Pino Presti – arranger/conductor in "E poi...", "La pioggia di marzo (Aguas de março)", "Domenica sera", "Bird Dog", "Distanze", "Fa qualcosa", "Mr. Blue", "La scala buia"
Bruno Canfora – arranger/conductor in "Amore mio"
Gianni Ferrio – arranger/conductor in "Non gioco più"
Toto Torquati – arranger/conductor in "Mai prima"
Carlo Pes and Pino Presti – arrangers/conductors in "Amanti di valore"
Nuccio Rinaldis – sound engineer

Mina (Italian singer) compilation albums
1975 compilation albums
Italian-language albums
Albums conducted by Pino Presti
Albums arranged by Pino Presti